Molagamudi is a village in Tirupati. The main activity of the village is agriculture.

Geography and climate
Molagamudi is located at the foothills of the Eastern Ghats, part of Rayalaseema region, and lies the extreme south of the Andhra Pradesh state.

The climate in Molagamudi is tropical. The temperatures are relatively lower than in the eastern parts of the Tirupati district. The  rainy season starts in late June or early July, but monsoons, from south west (from June to September) and north east (from October to December), remain moderate. In winter, which lasts till the end of February, the minimum temperatures range form .

References

Tirupati
Villages in Tirupati district